Frederick Lowe (7 September 1827 – 15 October 1887) was an Australian cricketer. He played one first-class cricket match for Victoria in 1856.

See also
 List of Victoria first-class cricketers

References

1827 births
1887 deaths
Australian cricketers
Victoria cricketers
People from Rushcliffe (district)
Cricketers from Nottinghamshire